Platycheirus scambus is a species of hoverfly. It is a Holarctic species.

Description
External images
For terms, see: Morphology of Diptera. Femora 1 is without long white hairs at base and with 5 dorsal long black bristles. Tibia 1 is irregularly increasing in width, with a small incision at the outer margin.
See references for determination.

Distribution
Palearctic: Fennoscandia south to central France, Ireland eastward to Northern Europe and Central Europe to European Russia and through Siberia and the Russian Far East. Nearctic: from Alaska to Quebec and south to California.

Biology
Habitat: fen, including coastal fen and river margins. Also lives in salt-marsh. It flies May to September.

References

Diptera of Europe
Syrphinae
Insects described in 1843